In theoretical physics, a dynamical horizon (DH) is a local description (i.e. independent of the global structure of Space–time) of evolving black-hole horizons. In the literature there exist two different mathematical formulations of DHs—the 2+2 formulation developed by Sean Hayward and the 3+1 formulation developed by Abhay Ashtekar and others (see ).  It provides a description of a black hole that is evolving (e.g. one that has a non-zero mass-energy influx).  A related formalism, for black holes with zero influx, is an isolated horizon.

Formal definition
The formal definition of a dynamical horizon is as follows:

See also 
Isolated horizon
Non-expanding horizon

References

Cross-reference

Sources used

Further reading

Broad outlines

Major papers

Other work
 
 
 
 
 
 

Black holes
General relativity